The Barrow County Courthouse, which is located on Courthouse Sq. in Winder, Georgia, was built in 1916.  It was listed on the National Register of Historic Places in 1980.

It was designed by J.J. Baldwin.  It has a one-story projecting entrance and a two-story Doric tetrastyleportico.  It has a three-stage clock tower with clocks facing in four directions.

The listing included two contributing buildings.

References

External links
 

County courthouses in Georgia (U.S. state)
National Register of Historic Places in Barrow County, Georgia
Neoclassical architecture in Georgia (U.S. state)
Gothic Revival architecture in Georgia (U.S. state)
Government buildings completed in 1916
1916 establishments in Georgia (U.S. state)